Frederique is a French female given name, which is equivalent to the male name Frederick, meaning "peaceful ruler". Alternative spellings include Frédérique and Frederieke. The name Frederique may refer to:

People
Frédérique Apffel-Marglin (born 1951), American anthropologist
Frédérique Audouin-Rouzeau (born 1957), French writer
Frédérique Bel (born 1975), French actress
Frederique Darragon (1949), French explorer
Frederique Derkx (born 1994), Dutch hockey player
Frédérique Dumas (born 1963), French film producer
Frédérique Lambert (born 1992), Canadian racquetball player
Frédérique Lenger (1921–2005), Belgian mathematics educator
Fredrique Paijkull (1836-1899), Swedish educator
Frédérique Petrides (1903–1983), American conductor 
Frédérique Ries (born 1959), Belgian politician
Frederieke Saeijs (born 1979), Dutch violinist
Frederique Trunk (born 1962), French musician
Frédérique Turgeon (born 1999), Canadian para-alpine skier
Frederique van der Wal (born 1967), Dutch model and businesswoman

See also
Federica
Frederica (given name)

Feminine given names